The February 2011 Perform Players Championship Finals was the third edition of the Professional Darts Corporation tournament, the Players Championship Finals, which saw the top 32 players from the 2010 PDC Players Championship Order of Merit taking part. The tournament took place between 3–6 February 2011 and was held at the Doncaster Dome, Doncaster, England, which hosted the event for the first time, after two years at the Circus Tavern in Purfleet.

Defending champion Paul Nicholson failed to qualify for this tournament after finishing just outside the top 32 of the 2010 Players Championship Order of Merit.

Phil Taylor regained the title after narrowly defeating Gary Anderson 13–12 in the final.

Prize money

Qualification
The top 32 players from the PDC Players Championship Order of Merit after the last Players Championship of 2010 qualified for the event.

Draw

Statistics

† = Hit twice in Round 2 match against Steve Beaton.

Live coverage
The tournament was broadcast live worldwide through the PDC's official website.

References

Players Championship Finals
Players Championship Finals
Players Championship Finals
Players Championship
Sport in Doncaster